

Managerial history

The following is a list of Preston North End managers and caretaker managers.

Statistics include League, FA Cup, League Cup and Football League Trophy matches. All points averages are calculated using three points for a win.

Caretaker managers are shown in italics.

References

Preston North End
Managers